Kacharava is a Georgian surname. It may refer to
Anatoli Kacharava (born 1910), Georgian sea captain and a World War II war veteran
Davit Kacharava (born 1985), Georgian rugby union player
Kakhaber Kacharava (born 1966), Georgian football coach and a former player
Nika Kacharava (born 1994), Georgian footballer
Timur Kacharava (1985–2005), Russian rock musician
Vazha Kacharava (born 1937), Georgian volleyball player